Radio broadcasts commenced in what is now known as Bangladesh in 1939 under British rule, as a part of All India Radio. The state-owned Bangladesh Betar monopolized the radio industry of the country until the launch of Radio Metrowave in 1999. The first FM radio station in Bangladesh, Bangladesh Betar Traffic Broadcasting, commenced transmissions in 2005, and the first privately owned FM radio station, Radio Today, commenced transmissions in 2006. There are currently 22 privately owned FM radio stations on the air in Bangladesh. This is a list of radio stations that are legally permitted by the Bangladesh Telecommunication Regulatory Commission.

State-owned radio stations

State-owned FM radio stations
This list is for state-owned FM radio stations only.

Privately owned radio stations
As of 2019, the Ministry of Information had licensed 28 private organizations for FM broadcasting, and the Bangladesh Telecommunication Regulatory Commission had assigned FM broadcasting spectrum to them.

Community radio
The Bangladesh NGOs Network for Radio and Communication (BNNRC), in special consultative status with the United Nations Economic and Social Council, considers community radio a special area for intervention. BNNRC has been promoting advocacy to the government in relation to community radio with other organizations since its emergence in 2000. As a result, The Ministry of Information of the People's Republic of Bangladesh announced the Community Radio Installation, Broadcast and Operation Policy 2008. Under this policy, The Ministry of Information approved 19 community radio stations for the first time in Bangladeshi history. To ensure the free flow of information to the people, the government enacted the Right to Information Act 2009.

Initially, the government approved 19 community groups:

See also

List of television stations in Bangladesh
Media of Bangladesh
Telecommunications in Bangladesh

References

Radio in Bangladesh
Bangladesh communications-related lists
Bangladesh